Overproduction is the excessive use of audio effects, layering, or digital manipulation in music production.

Uses of the term
It is not always clear what critics mean by "overproduction", but there are a minimum of a few common uses of the term:

Heavy use of audio processing effects such as reverb, delay, or dynamic range compression.
Heavy layering or multitracking; in the context of pop and rock music, this may refer to the addition of elements such as chorused vocals or backing strings.
Radio versions of songs pushed to be more "pop" through the use of loud drum beats or other instrumentation changes.
Heavy use of pitch correction, time correction, or quantization.
A recording overseen by a producer who "imposes" their own distinctive "sound" or techniques on a band or artist; Producers frequently accused of this kind of "overproduction" include Phil Spector and Mutt Lange.

All five of these meanings share the idea that a record producer or mastering engineer has made "unnecessary" additions or changes to a record in the production process and, in doing so, has decreased the quality or enjoyability of the music. There is little consensus among music critics or producers about when the use of an effect or production technique becomes excessive. For this reason, some producers consider the term unhelpful, confusing, and subjective.

Current trends
The excessive use of dynamic range compression has been bemoaned by critics as part of the "loudness war". In August 2006, Bob Dylan criticized modern recording techniques, saying that modern records "have sound all over them" and that they sound like "static". Those responding to Dylan's comments seemed to assume that he was referring to the trend of increasingly compressed music.

The use of the Auto-Tune audio processor for pitch correction has become pervasive in pop music since late 1998, and has elicited criticism.

In spite of the decreasing cost and increasing availability of professional or near-professional recording software and techniques, musicians and producers in some genres consciously set themselves against the idea of "overproduction" and attempt to make music with a rough or "lo-fi" sound.

See also
Wall of Sound

Notes

Music journalism
Music production